Drozena Wilfred Bannister Eden (26 November 1908 – 27 November 1973) was an Australian rules footballer who played for Port Adelaide in the South Australian National Football League (SANFL). He and his brother were of Mauritian descent. His career was cut short due to persistent leg and back injuries.

Eden impressed in some Port Adelaide trial games in 1929 playing in the centre for the matches, with The Advertiser describing his playing style as "outstanding".

Eden was elected practice captain for the 1935 season. He enlisted for military service on 2 July 1940.

References

External links

1908 births
1973 deaths
Australian people of Mauritian descent
Port Adelaide Football Club (SANFL) players
Port Adelaide Football Club players (all competitions)
Australian rules footballers from South Australia
People from Queenstown, South Australia
Australian military personnel of World War II